Tümengken Tsoghtu Khong Tayiji (Classical Mongolian: , Tümengken čoγtu qong tayiǰi; modern Mongolian: , , Tümenkhen Tsogt Khun Taij; ; 1581–1637), was a noble in Northern Khalkha. He expanded into Amdo (present-day Qinghai) to help the Karma Kagyu sect of Tibetan Buddhism but was overthrown by Güshi Khan, who supported the rival Gelug sect. He is also known for writing a famous poem in 1621, which was transcribed on the surface of a rock in 1624, and still exists.

He established a base on the Tuul river. Known as an intellectual, he embraced the Karma sect and built monasteries and castles. In 1601, he built the White Castle, or the White House of Choghtu Khong Tayiji.

He submitted himself to Ligdan Khan, last grand khan of the Mongols. He took part in Ligdan's campaign to Tibet to help the Karma sect although Ligdan Khan died in 1634 before they joined together. But he pursued the campaign. In the same year, he conquered the Tümed around Kokonor (Qinghai Lake) and moved his base there. By request from Shamar Rabjampa, he sent an army under his son Arslan to central Tibet in 1635. However, Arslan attacked his ally Tsang army. He met the fifth Dalai Lama and paid homage to Gelukpa monasteries instead of destroying them. Arslan was eventually assassinated by Tsoghtu's order.

The Geluk sect asked for help Törü Bayikhu (Güshi Khan), the leader of the Khoshuud tribe of the Oirat confederation. In 1636, Törö Bayikhu led the Khoshuud and the Dzungars to Tibet. In the next year a decisive war between Tsoghtu Khong Tayiji and Törü Bayikhu ended in the latter's victory and Tsoght was killed.

Descendants of Sutai Yeldeng, Tsoghtu's grandson, succeeded the jasagh of a banner in Sain Noyon Khan Aimag.

He has traditionally been portrayed as evil by the Geluk sect. On the other hand, the Mongolian movie Tsogt taij (1945) treated him as a national hero.

References

Okada Hidehiro 岡田英弘, Čoɤtu Qong Tayiǰi ni tsuite Čoɤtu Qong Tayiǰi について, Ajia Afurika gengo kenkyū 1 アジア・アフリカ言語研究 1, February 1968, pp. 111–125. He provided a brief biography of Choghtu Khong Tayiji and the inscription of Čaɤan bayising.
Yamaguchi Zuihō (山口瑞鳳), Chibetto (チベット), University of Tokyo Press, 1988. He utilized Tibetan materials. His paper  is also cited by Okada's work. Kojitsu Kan no Chibetto shihai ni itaru keii 顧実汗のチベット支配に至る経緯, Iwai Daisetsu hakushi koki kinen tenseki ronshū  岩井大慧博士古希記念典籍論集, 1963.
Oyunbilig (乌云毕力格): On Choktu Taidji (关于绰克图台吉), 内蒙古大学学报 哲学社会科学版 1987 No.3, pp. 52–57.

1581 births
1637 deaths
History of Mongolia
Khalkha